Starting in the 1990s, the city of San Francisco, and the surrounding San Francisco Bay Area have faced a serious affordable housing shortage, such that by October 2015, San Francisco had the highest rents of any major US city. The nearby city of San Jose, had the fourth highest rents, and adjacent Oakland, had the sixth highest. Over the period April 2012 to December 2017, the median house price in most counties in the Bay Area nearly doubled. Late San Francisco mayor Ed Lee called the shortage a "housing crisis", and news reports stated that addressing the shortage was the mayor's "top priority". The Bay Area's housing shortage is related to the California housing shortage.

Strict zoning regulations are a primary cause behind the housing shortage in San Francisco. Historically, zoning regulations were implemented to restrict housing construction in wealthy neighborhoods, as well as prevent people of color from moving into white neighborhoods. When explicit racial discrimination was prohibited with the 1968 Fair Housing Act, white neighborhoods began instituting zoning regulations that heavily prioritized single-family housing and prohibited construction of the kinds of housing that poor minorities could afford.

Causes

Since the 1960s, San Francisco and the surrounding Bay Area have enacted strict zoning regulations. Among other restrictions, San Francisco does not allow buildings over 40 feet tall in most of the city, and has passed laws making it easier for neighbors to block developments. Partly as a result of these codes, from 2007 to 2014, the Bay Area issued building permits for only half the number of needed houses, based on the area's population growth. During the same time, there was rapid economic growth of the high tech industry in San Francisco and nearby Silicon Valley, which created hundreds of thousands of new jobs. The resultant high demand for housing, combined with the lack of supply, (caused by severe restrictions on the building of new housing units) caused dramatic increases in rents and extremely high housing prices. For example, from 2012 to 2016, the San Francisco metropolitan area added 373,000 new jobs, but permitted only 58,000 new housing units.

Vacancies have also been highlighted as an issue in San Francisco and nearby cities, with Curbed estimating in 2019 that "San Francisco has nearly five empty homes per homeless resident."

Effects
The city of San Francisco has strict rent control laws. However, a California state law called the Ellis Act allows landlords to evict rent-controlled tenants by going out of business, and fully exiting the rental market. By 2013, hundreds of tenants had been evicted through the Ellis Act process.

Due to the advances of the city's economy from the increase of tourism, the boom of innovative tech companies, and insufficient new housing production, the rent increased by more than 50 percent by the 1990s. Many affluent tech workers migrated to San Francisco in pursuit of job opportunities and the lack of housing in the South Bay. Until the end of the 1960s, San Francisco had affordable housing, which allowed people from many different backgrounds to settle down, but the economic shift impacted the city's demographics. All of this resulted in constant gentrification of many neighborhoods.  By 1995, residents of areas such as the Tenderloin and The Mission District, which house many immigrants and low-income families, were faced with the possibility of eviction, in order to develop low-income housing to more luxurious housing, which caters to the advances of the economy.  For example, residents of the Mission District, constituting 5 percent of the city's population, experienced 14 percent of the citywide evictions in the year 2000.

The effect of housing policies has been to discourage migration to California, especially San Francisco and other coastal areas, as the California Legislative Analyst's Office 2015 report "California's High Housing Costs - Causes and Consequences" details: [From 1980-2010]
 
"If California had added 210,000 new housing units each year over the past three decades (as opposed to 120,000), [enough to keep California's housing prices no more than 80% higher than the median for the U.S. as a whole--the price differential which existed in 1980] population would be much greater than it is today.

We estimate that around 7 million additional people would be living in California.

In some areas, particularly the Bay Area, population increases would be dramatic. For example,

San Francisco's population would be more than twice as large (1.7 million people versus around 800,000)." 

On this issue, New York Times opinion writer Farhad Manjoo stated in 2019: "What Republicans want to do with I.C.E. and border walls, wealthy progressive Democrats are doing with zoning and Nimbyism. Preserving “local character,” maintaining “local control,” keeping housing scarce and inaccessible — the goals of both sides are really the same: to keep people out."

Responses
Housing has become a key political issue in Bay Area elections. In November 2015, San Francisco voters rejected two ballot propositions both of which were claimed by their supporters to reduce the crisis. The first, Proposition F, would have enacted a number of restrictions on Airbnb rentals within the city. The second, Proposition I or the "Mission Moratorium", would have blocked all housing development in San Francisco's Mission District for 18 months, except for developments in which every apartment was subsidized at a below-market rate.

To address evictions, San Francisco City Supervisor David Campos (D9) passed two new city ordinances, each requiring landlords to pay tens of thousands of dollars to each tenant evicted under the Ellis Act. The first ordinance was struck down in 2014 as unconstitutional under the Fifth Amendment, while the second was rejected the following yer as contrary to California state law.

Mayor Ed Lee responded to the shortage by calling for the construction of 30,000 new housing units by 2020, and proposing a $310 million city bond to fund below-market-rate housing units. The goal of 30,000 new units was approved by San Francisco voters in 2014's Proposition K, and the affordable housing bond was passed in 2015 as Proposition A.

In 2015, then City Supervisor Scott Wiener (D8) criticized the advocates of anti-development laws, writing an article titled "Yes, Supply & Demand Apply to Housing, Even in San Francisco" in response to Proposition I. Wiener called for greatly increasing the supply of all housing, including both subsidized housing and housing at market rate.

In 2017, almost 75% of all city land zoned residential allowed only single-family homes or duplexes.  David Garcia, policy director of the Terner Center for Housing Innovation at UC Berkeley, said that a proposal to allow fourplexes everywhere would be a more equitable proposal, and that research shows that the housing shortage is so large that limiting new housing to specific areas would not sufficiently address the shortage.

In October 2021, the Board of Supervisors and Mayor Breed's office passed a proposal to allow slightly greater density by legalizing fourplexes for each lot and six unit complexes on corner lots. Further, the measure lessens the property ownership time from five years (as the original proposal stated) to one year before owners can subdivide lots. While the policy has limited impact on streamlining the housing approval process, policy proposer and Board of Supervisor Rafael Mandelman called it "ian important step in the right direction to increase [housing] density in San Francisco". 

One of the main avenues for increasing the amount of long-term housing options available to unhoused individuals is the removal of current affordable housing construction obstacles. While the city’s Board of Supervisors approved a streamlining ballot measure that would expedite the development approval process for projects that paid construction workers a middle-class wage for developments that are either 100% affordable housing, increased affordability/mixed-income housing, or educator housing, the proposal (Proposition D) received only 49% of the minimum required 51% of votes in the November 2022 election. Since then, robust policy proposals to streamline approval time have been limited.

See also 
 California housing shortage
Access to affordable housing in the Silicon Valley

References

Housing in California
2010s in San Francisco
Buildings and structures in the San Francisco Bay Area
2000s in San Francisco
1990s in San Francisco
Economy of the San Francisco Bay Area
History of the San Francisco Bay Area